Martin Bear's Arm (born  1864) was a tribal historian of the Hidatsa (Gros Ventres) tribe. He was born in and lived for a time in Like-a-Fishhook Village on the Fort Berthold Indian Reservation in central North Dakota. Bear's Arm was an artist particularly known for a pictographic chart of Like-a-Fishhook Village, as it was before the village was abandoned in the 1880s. His work is in the collection of the State Historical Society of North Dakota.

References 

19th-century American painters
19th-century indigenous painters of the Americas
Native American painters
Hidatsa people
1864 births
Artists from North Dakota
Year of death missing